ISM is an information technology service company based in Regina, Saskatchewan. The main company office is currently located in the ISM Building which was built by the University of Regina in 1991 to suit ISM Canada's needs. The company is a wholly owned subsidiary of Kyndryl Canada Limited, that serves both public and private sector organizations.

ISM is headquartered in Regina, Saskatchewan and has offices in Saskatoon - Saskatchewan, Burnaby - British Columbia, and Victoria - British Columbia, but provides services to customers all across Canada. ISM is one of Canada's Top 100 Employers (2019), Saskatchewan's top 100 employers (2019), and Canada's top family-friendly employers (2019).

History

1973
The Saskatchewan Computer Utility Corporation (SaskCOMP) was established in April 1973 under General Manager L.T.Holmes 
SaskCOMP was formed through the acquisition of the Systems Centre Branch of the Department of Government Services and Saskatchewan Power Corporation Computer Services. The corporations initial objective was to consolidate and combine computer services for provincially-funded institutions

1974
Further expansion of SaskCOMP - with the acquisition of the University of Saskatchewan, Saskatoon Campus Computation Centre and the University of Saskatchewan, Regina Campus Computer Centre. SaskCOMP's major new customers were the City of Prince Albert and the Saskatchewan Government Insurance office

1975–1980
The central theme for SaskCOMP was improved ease of access to computers. Revenue grew by 16% overall and software associated with new services increased four-fold and was expected to double again in 1976. In 1976, Norm E.Glassel took over as General Manager of SaskCOMP and a comprehensive mandate was formed for the corporation. The computers at the three main centres in PA, Saskatoon and Regina were linked via telecommunications lines to enable SaskCOMP customers at any one centre to use the services of another. SaskCOMP created a Minicomputer Division to provide minicomputer services to customers as readily as large-scale computers

In 1977, SaskCOMP installed the IBM System/370 Model 168 computer to replace a model 158 computer. The Model 158 computer was sold for $640,000. In 1978 SaskCOMP had grown to become the twelfth largest service bureau in Canada! In 1979, SaskCOMP was part of a newly formed committee with the Department of Education and the Saskatchewan Teacher's Federation to promote the effective use of - and guidelines for the installation of - microcomputers in primary and secondary schools. In 1980, SaskCOMP moved into the new Galleria building at Innovation Place Research Park in Saskatoon.

1981–1990
The personal computer revolution began. SaskCOMP was leasing IBM's largest system and became the 8th largest computer operation in Canada. SaskCOMP rates were the lowest in the Canadian service bureau industry. In 1983, SaskCOMP celebrated its 10th anniversary!Efforts continued to focus on data security with new security policies, dedicated security employees and secure storage. SaskCOMP increased the CPU capacity by 40% at Regina Regional Centre by upgrading equipment through a contract with IBM. Affirmative action was introduced to attract more target group employees to SaskCOMP.

In 1986, SaskCOMP deployed the first Disaster Recovery Service in Western Canada. Gerald Thom was named the President of SaskCOMP. Remote control centres were established to provide access over high-speed lines. A new corporate registry was established for use by the legal profession to search for information on registered and non-profit companies. SaskCOMP upgraded technology with a new IBM 3090-200E processor installation.

In 1988, SaskCOMP became Westbridge Group. Four provincially owned companies merged, and were privatized. A new direction in data storage was implemented with "tomorrow's technology in mind." In 1989, Westbridge shifted to integrated technology services. Len McCurdy was named president. Westbridge was listed as a penny stock on the Toronto Stock Exchange and every employee got 100 shares. At this time, the corporation nearly became insolvent due to investment in Mr. McCurdy's previous computer leasing company, just as computer leasing was becoming unprofitable.

1991–2000
ISM Information Systems Management Corporation was formed through the merger of Westbridge Computer Corp and STM Systems Corp. The official opening of the new head office at 1 Research Drive, Regina. IBM assumed a controlling financial interest in ISM Canada. IBM outsourced its internal computer operations (host and client-server systems) to ISM. ISM ranked as one of the top 500 Canadian companies, moving up almost 300 places in the survey by Commerce magazine.

In 1995, ISM Information Systems Management Corporation becomes 100% owned by IBM. ISM sponsored the Grey Cup 1995 in Regina: "Huddle Up in Saskatchewan." In 1997, major organizational changes occurred with the creation of IBM Global Services.

IBM Canada formed Regina-based ISM Canada (ISM Information Systems Management Canada Corporation) in 2000.

2021
ISM became a subsidiary of Kyndryl Canada Limited on September 1, 2021

References

1973 establishments in Saskatchewan
Companies based in Regina, Saskatchewan
IBM acquisitions
IBM subsidiaries
Canadian companies established in 1973
Software companies established in 1973
Software companies of Canada
1995 mergers and acquisitions
Canadian subsidiaries of foreign companies